Point or points may refer to:

Places
 Point, Lewis, a peninsula in the Outer Hebrides, Scotland
 Point, Texas, a city in Rains County, Texas, United States
 Point, the NE tip and a ferry terminal of Lismore, Inner Hebrides, Scotland
 Points, West Virginia, an unincorporated community in the United States

Business and finance
Point (loyalty program), a type of virtual currency in common use among mercantile loyalty programs, globally
Point (mortgage), a percentage sometimes referred to as a form of pre-paid interest used to reduce interest rates in a mortgage loan
 Basis point, 1/100 of one percent, denoted bp, bps, and ‱
 Percentage points, used to measure a change in percentage absolutely
 Pivot point (technical analysis), a price level of significance in analysis of a financial market that is used as a predictive indicator of market movement
 "Points", the term for profit sharing in the American film industry, where creatives involved in making the film get a defined percentage of the net profits or even gross receipts
 Royalty points, a way of sharing profit between companies and unit holders
 Vigorish point, the commission charged on a gambling bet or loanshark's loan

Mathematics

 Point (geometry), an entity that has a location in space or on a plane, but has no extent; more generally, an element of some abstract topological space
 Point, or Element (category theory), generalizes the set-theoretic concept of an element of a set to an object of any category
 Critical point (mathematics), a stationary point of a function of an arbitrary number of variables
 Decimal point
 Point-free geometry
 Stationary point, a point in the domain of a single-valued function where the value of the function ceases to change

Measurement units
 Point (gemstone), 2 milligrams, or one hundredth of a carat
 Point (typography), a measurement used in printing, the meaning of which has changed over time
 Point, in hunting, the number of antler tips on the hunted animal (e.g. 9 point buck)
 Point, for describing paper-stock thickness, a synonym of mil and thou (one thousandth of an inch)
 Point, a hundredth of an inch or 0.254 mm, a unit of measurement formerly used for rainfall in Australia
 Paris point, 2/3 cm, used for shoe sizes
 Points of the compass, one of the 32 directions on a traditional compass, equal to one eighth of a right angle (11.25 degrees)

Sports
 Point (American football)
 Point (basketball)
 Point (ice hockey)
 Point (pickleball)
 Point (tennis)
 Point, fielding (cricket)
 Point, in sports Score
 Point guard, in basketball
 Points (association football)
 Points decision, in boxing and some other fighting sports
 The point (ice hockey), the location of an ice hockey player

Technology and transport 
 Point, a data element in a SCADA system representing a single input or output
 Points, a contact breaker in an ignition system
 Points, a railroad switch (British English)
 Points, the clock position of an object seen from a moving vessel or aircraft on an imaginary horizontal clock with 12:00 at the front; e.g., two points to starboard is 2:00
 Points of sail, a sailing boat's course in relation to wind direction
 Point system (driving), a system of demerits for driving offenses
 Projectile point, a hafted archaeological artifact used as a knife or projectile tip
 Public Oregon Intercity Transit, styled POINT, a public transit system

Arts, entertainment, and media

Music
 Point (album), a 2001 album by Cornelius
 Point #1, a 1999 album of Chevelle
 Point Music, a record label
 Points (album), by jazz pianist Matthew Shipp
 "The Points",  a 1995 single and video from the Panther soundtrack
 Point (Yello album), a 2020 album by Yello
 "Point", a song by the American band Bright from their self-titled album

Other uses in arts, entertainment, and media
 High card points, used for hand evaluation in contract bridge
 Le Point, a French weekly
 On Point, a radio show
 Point Broadcasting, a radio broadcasting company
 Pointe technique, a ballet technique for dancing on the tips of toes
 Take Point (2018), a South Korean action film

Other uses
 Point (coat color), animal fur coloration of the extremities
Point (geography), a peninsula or headland
 Point (surname), a surname
 Make a point or come to a point, a hunting term referring to a pointing dog's standing rigid and facing the prey
 On point, someone who possesses abundant and various qualities of competence, leadership or style, or to specific acts which demonstrate such qualities
 Point man, one who takes point (defined below) on patrol, the lookout in the commission of a crime, a defense position in ice hockey, or someone who leads the defense of a political position
 Point mutation, a change in a single nucleotide
 Take point (or walk point, be on point, or be a point man), to be the lead, and likely most vulnerable, soldier, vehicle, or unit in a combat military formation
 Point University, West Point, Georgia

See also
 Endpoint (disambiguation)
 Lapointe (disambiguation), also Lepoint/La Pointe/Le Point
 Midpoint (disambiguation)
 Point Lookout (disambiguation)
 Pointing (disambiguation)
 Points system (disambiguation)
 Start Point (disambiguation)
 The Point (disambiguation)
 Tipping point (disambiguation)